Alijilán is a village and municipality in Catamarca Province in northwestern Argentina.

See also
Antofalla, Catamarca
Atacama people

References

Populated places in Catamarca Province